Its apperture is purple in color Murichorda fiscellum, common name : the little basket drupe, is a species of sea snail, a marine gastropod mollusk in the family Muricidae, the murex snails or rock snails.

Description
The shell size varies between 14 mm and 40 mm

Distribution
This species occurs in the Red Sea, off Réunion and in the Indo-West Pacific.

References

 Dautzenberg, P. (1923). Liste preliminaire des mollusques marins de Madagascar et description de deux especes nouvelles. Journal de Conchyliologie 68: 21–74
  Houart, R.: Zuccon, D. & Puillandre, N. (2019). Description of new genera and new species of Ergalataxinae (Gastropoda: Muricidae). Novapex. 20 (Hors série 12): 1-52

External links
 
 Gmelin J.F. (1791). Vermes. In: Gmelin J.F. (Ed.) Caroli a Linnaei Systema Naturae per Regna Tria Naturae, Ed. 13. Tome 1(6). G.E. Beer, Lipsiae
 Gmelin J.F. (1791). Vermes. In: Gmelin J.F. (Ed.) Caroli a Linnaei Systema Naturae per Regna Tria Naturae, Ed. 13. Tome 1(6). G.E. Beer, Lipsiae [Leipzig. pp. 3021-3910]
 Eydoux, J. F. T. & Souleyet, L. F. A. (1852). Voyage autour du monde exécuté pendant les années 1836 et 1837 sur la corvette La Bonite commandée par M. Vaillant. Zoologie, Tome Deuxième. Zoologie. Bertrand, Paris. 664 pp., Paris (Arthus Bertrand)
 Reeve, L. A. (1845-1849). Monograph of the genus Murex. In: Conchologia Iconica: or, illustrations of the shells of molluscous animals, vol. 3, pls 1-37 and unpaginated text. L. Reeve & Co., London
 Sowerby, G. B., I; Sowerby, G. B., II. (1832-1841). The conchological illustrations or, Coloured figures of all the hitherto unfigured recent shells. London, privately published
 Adams, H. & Adams, A. (1864). Descriptions of new species of shells, chiefly from the Cumingian collection. Proceedings of the Zoological Society of London. 1863: 428-435
 Duclos [P. L.. (1832). Description de quelques espèces de pourpres, servant de type à six sections établies dans ce genre. Annales des Sciences Naturelles. 26: 103-112]
 Lesson R.P. (1844). Description de quatre espèces nouvelles de Murex. L'Echo du Monde Savant. 11(23): 536-539; 11(24): 11(24): 568-570.
 Quoy J.R.C. & Gaimard J.P. (1832-1835). Voyage de découvertes de l'"Astrolabe" exécuté par ordre du Roi, pendant les années 1826-1829, sous le commandement de M. J. Dumont d'Urville. Zoologie

Murichorda
Gastropods described in 1791
Taxa named by Johann Friedrich Gmelin